Antwan Tolhoek (born 29 April 1994) is a Dutch cyclist, who currently rides for UCI WorldTeam .

Life and career
Born in Yerseke, Tolhoek was named as part of the  squad in the startlist for the 2017 Vuelta a España. In December 2017, he was suspended for 2 months by his team, for possession of sleeping pills during a pre-season training camp – violating the team's internal rules. In July 2018, he was named in the start list for the 2018 Tour de France. In May 2019, he was named in the startlist for the 2019 Giro d'Italia.

His father Patrick Tolhoek was also a professional cyclist.

Major results

2015
 1st  Mountains classification, Tour de Bretagne
2016
 1st  Mountains classification, Tour de Suisse
2017
 4th Japan Cup
2018
 2nd Japan Cup
 10th Clásica de San Sebastián
2019
 1st Stage 6 Tour de Suisse
 4th Overall Tour of Guangxi
2021
 2nd Overall Vuelta a Andalucía

Grand Tour general classification results timeline

References

External links

1994 births
Living people
Dutch male cyclists
People from Reimerswaal
Cyclists from Zeeland
Tour de Suisse stage winners
21st-century Dutch people